Camila Ayala is a track and road cyclist from Argentina. She represented her nation at the 2005 UCI Road World Championships.

References

External links
 profile at Procyclingstats.com

Argentine female cyclists
Living people
Place of birth missing (living people)
Year of birth missing (living people)